Yazoo County Airport  is five miles northwest of Yazoo City in unincorporated Yazoo County, Mississippi. It is owned by the County of Yazoo.

The National Plan of Integrated Airport Systems for 2011–2015 called it a general aviation facility. In 2010 the airport got a $76,931 Federal Aviation Administration Airport Improvement Program grant for apron lighting.

The airport has a  lighted runway that was built in 1993 and upgraded in 2000. As of 2001 the airport houses two agricultural businesses and a repair service. Lynne W. Jeter of the Mississippi Business Journal said in 2001 that the county airport "may have played an important role in landing the multi-phase federal prison project that is currently under expansion," referring to the Federal Bureau of Prisons Federal Correctional Complex, Yazoo City.

Facilities
Yazoo County Airport covers 300 acres (121 ha) at an elevation of 105 feet (32 m). Its one runway, 17/35, is 5,001 by 100 feet (1,524 x 30 m) asphalt.

In the year ending March 6, 2012 the airport had 12,800 aircraft operations, average 35 per day: 99% general aviation and 1% military. Ten single-engine aircraft were then based at the airport.

See also 

 List of airports in Mississippi

References

External links 
 Aerial image as of February 1996 from USGS The National Map
 
 

Airports in Mississippi
Transportation in Yazoo County, Mississippi
Buildings and structures in Yazoo County, Mississippi